The Lafayette County Courthouse is located in Oxford, Mississippi and listed on the National Register of Historic Places. 

The current structure was constructed in 1872 to replace an earlier building burned during the Civil War by Union troops directed by General Andrew Jackson Smith. Spires Boling of the firm Willis, Sloan and Trigg was the courthouse's architect. Two subsequent expansions of the building were performed. In 1952 and 1953, the west and east bays were added. The structure was renovated in 1981. 

The Courthouse currently houses several judicial courtrooms and related offices, including the Third Circuit Judicial District Court, and the Third Circuit District Drug Court, which both serve Benton, Calhoun, Chickasaw, Lafayette, Marshall, Tippah, and Union counties. The Courthouse also contains the office of the Circuit Court Clerk.

According to the court's website, "Mississippi's Circuit Courts hear felony criminal prosecutions and civil lawsuits. Circuit Courts hear appeals from County, Justice and Municipal courts and from administrative boards and commissions such as the Workers' Compensation Commission and the Mississippi Department of Employment Security."

As the structural centerpiece to the home of William Faulkner, the Courthouse also plays a significant role in Faulkner's fictional Jefferson County. The Courthouse appears in multiple works. These include stories featuring the lawyer Gavin Stevens (including Knight's Gambit), the dramatic ending to The Sound and the Fury, and elements of Go Down, Moses.

Gallery

References

Courthouses on the National Register of Historic Places in Mississippi
Greek Revival architecture in Mississippi
Italianate architecture in Mississippi
Government buildings completed in 1871
Buildings and structures in Oxford, Mississippi
National Register of Historic Places in Lafayette County, Mississippi
Individually listed contributing properties to historic districts on the National Register in Mississippi
County courthouses in Mississippi